The Canada national cricket team toured Sri Lanka in May 2001 and played eight one-day matches against various provincial teams in Colombo, Galle, Moratuwa and Gampaha.

References

External links
 CricketArchive

2001 in Canadian sports
2001 in Sri Lankan cricket
Canadian cricket tours abroad
Sri Lankan cricket seasons from 2000–01
International cricket competitions in 2000–01
Canada–Sri Lanka relations